Fast ForWord is a computer-based reading program intended to help students develop and strengthen the cognitive skills necessary for successful reading and learning by Scientific Learning Corporation.

Research 
The research literature on Fast ForWord was reviewed by What Works Clearinghouse, an initiative of the U.S. Department of Education’s Institute of Education Sciences. Positive effectiveness ratings and improvement indices were found for alphabetics, reading fluency, comprehension, and English language development. However, the quality of evidence included in these reviews has come under criticism, as it included reports that had not undergone peer review and that were produced by the company marketing the intervention.

A 2011 systematic review that focused on high-quality randomized controlled trials did not find any positive benefit of the intervention. However, an official response by Scientific Learning Corporation pointed out that the five studies included in the review only examined cases where Fast ForWord was poorly implemented and cited other peer-reviewed research studies that found that when properly implemented, Fast ForWord does produce significant impacts on student learning.

Fast ForWord's claims of rewiring the brain have also been scrutinized, alongside other brain training programs, for their veracity. One criticism was published in a 2016 article, which questions brain training programs in general. It noted: 

In response, Dr. Henry Mahncke (one of the authors of a study that the 2016 article cited) pointed out many issues with the article, including basic factual errors, author bias, and problematic methodologies. The scientific community continues to research and debate the efficacy of various approaches to neuroplasticity-based brain training.

History 
The Fast ForWord products evolved from the theory of a number of scientists, including Michael Merzenich, Bill Jenkins, Paula Tallal, and Steven Miller. This team started the Scientific Learning Corporation in 1996. The company created Fast ForWord. The theory was that some children who have language and literacy learning difficulties may have problems rapidly processing sounds, a following theory that cognitive training can improve auditory processing, and a final theory that this training will generalize to improve learning skills beyond those in the training tasks.

References

External links 
 

Software for children
Learning to read
Brain training programs